120 Minutes is a television program in the United States dedicated to the alternative music genre, that originally aired on MTV from 1986 to 2000, and then aired on MTV's associate channel MTV2 from 2001 to 2003.

After its cancellation, MTV2 premiered a replacement program called Subterranean. A similar but separate MTV Classic program, also titled 120 Minutes, plays many classic alternative videos that were regularly seen on 120 Minutes in its heyday.

120 Minutes returned as a monthly program on MTV2 on July 30, 2011, with Matt Pinfield as host.

History

The early years
 120 Minutes began on March 10, 1986. For the first ten years of 120 Minutes, viewers could see artists as varied as The Jesus and Mary Chain, Bronski Beat, New Order, The Replacements, The Verve, James, Slowdive, Weezer, Robyn Hitchcock, The Stone Roses, Oasis, 10,000 Maniacs, Blur, Butthole Surfers, Radiohead, KMFDM, Kate Bush, Ramones, XTC, Morrissey, The Smashing Pumpkins, Kitchens of Distinction, Sarah McLachlan, They Might Be Giants, Dinosaur Jr., Rage Against the Machine, Hüsker Dü, The Offspring, Sparklehorse, and Bad Religion. Nirvana's music video for "Smells Like Teen Spirit" received a world premiere on 120 Minutes, but soon proved so popular that the channel began to air it during its regular daytime rotation. For a time in the mid-1990s, a companion program called Alternative Nation aired every weeknight on MTV.

From MTV to MTV2
As time went on, and MTV found television reality series like The Real World immensely profitable, the program found its time slot pushed further back. As this was happening, the program's playlist was becoming more and more mainstream, playing the likes of Sum 41 and Staind, and the program was more frequently preempted (usually without any warning) for reruns of The Real World, Loveline, and Undressed before being removed from the airwaves in the summer of 2000. In 2001, the program returned to the airwaves on MTV2, where it returned to the style of music it was known for.

Cancellation
On May 4, 2003, the program was canceled with no formal announcement from MTV2. Jim Shearer, the current host at the time, shared the screen with the creator of 120 Minutes, Dave Kendall, as well as Matt Pinfield. The two "classic era" hosts shared their favorite videos from over the years (a full playlist for the final episode can be found here ), finally ending with the selection of Siouxsie and the Banshees's "Kiss Them for Me" as the final video aired.

120 Minutes with Matt Pinfield

120 Minutes made its return to MTV2 on July 31, 2011, at 1 am ET. Matt Pinfield reprised his role as the host and the program was formally called 120 Minutes with Matt Pinfield. The revived program initially aired on a monthly basis, but returned to a weekly format in late November 2011.  It aired Fridays 6 am-8 am on MTV2. In addition to videos and interviews from alternative rock and indie rock artists, the program also featured music from underground hip hop, alternative hip hop, electronica, turntablism, and dubstep artists. 120 Minutes also aired as a two-minute clip in a series called 120 Seconds which can be seen on MTVhive.com.

120 Minutes was taken off the MTV2 schedule without announcement. The last airing was February 1, 2013. A two-hour indie block called Artists to Watch took its slot during the same Friday 7AM-9AM ET block. However, that program stopped airing .

, MTV's sister channel MTV Classic (formerly called VH1 Classic) airs a similar program with the name 120 Minutes (formerly called "The Alternative") on its Sunday midnight time slot (on which the original show aired). This version of the show, however, has no host and highlights more well established alternative artists of the 1980s and 1990s; mostly replaying videos that originally aired on MTV.

List of 120 Minutes hosts
The following MTV VJs hosted 120 Minutes on a regular basis.
 J. J. Jackson (1986)
 Martha Quinn (1986)
 Alan Hunter (1986)
 Downtown Julie Brown (1980s)
 Adam Curry (1987)
 Carolyne Heldman (1980s)
 Kevin Seal (1986-1987)
 Dave Kendall (1988-1992)
 Lewis Largent (1992–1995)
 Matt Pinfield (1995–1999; 2011–2012)
 Dave Holmes (1999–2000)
 Jancee Dunn (2001)
 Chris Booker (2001–2002)
 Jim Shearer (2002–2003)

120 Minutes albums

Never Mind the Mainstream
In 1991, two CDs were released entitled "Never Mind the Mainstream: The Best of MTV's 120 Minutes" volumes 1 and 2 and featured many songs featured on the program. Artists included Red Hot Chili Peppers, Echo & the Bunnymen, Julian Cope, R.E.M., Sinéad O'Connor, Ministry, Depeche Mode, Sonic Youth, and Violent Femmes. The title referenced the Sex Pistols' landmark album Never Mind the Bollocks, but fortuitously recalled the title of Nirvana's Nevermind album which was released near-simultaneously.

Volume One:
Red Hot Chili Peppers – Higher Ground
Soul Asylum – Sometime to Return
The Stone Roses – Fools Gold (Single Edit)
The Mission UK – Wasteland
Bob Mould – See a Little Light (CD Bonus Track)
The Church – Under the Milky Way
Cocteau Twins – Carolyn's Fingers (CD Bonus Track)
Julian Cope – World Shut Your Mouth
Sinéad O'Connor – Mandinka
Sonic Youth – Kool Thing
 Robyn Hitchcock & The Egyptians – Balloon Man
World Party – Put the Message in the Box (CD Bonus Track)
XTC – Dear God
They Might Be Giants – Ana Ng
Camper Van Beethoven – Eye of Fatima (Pt. 1)
Modern English – I Melt with You (CD Bonus Track)

Volume Two:
R.E.M. – Orange Crush
Public Image Ltd. – This Is Not a Love Song
Ramones – Do You Remember Rock 'N' Roll Radio?
X – Burning House of Love (CD Bonus Track)
Ministry – Stigmata
Morrissey – Everyday Is Like Sunday
The Jesus and Mary Chain – Head On (CD Bonus Track)
Echo and the Bunnymen – The Killing Moon
Joy Division – Love Will Tear Us Apart
New Order – The Perfect Kiss
Depeche Mode – Personal Jesus
The Sugarcubes – Birthday (CD Bonus Track)
Hüsker Dü – Could You Be the One?
Faith No More – We Care a Lot
Violent Femmes – Gone Daddy Gone
Wire – Eardrum Buzz (CD Bonus Track)

120 Minutes Live
In 1998, an album was released by Atlantic Records featuring 14 of the best and most memorable live performances on 120 Minutes from the 1990s.
 Oasis – "Supersonic"
 Morphine – "Honey White"
 Porno for Pyros – "Kimberly Austin"
 Evan Dando – "It's About Time"
 P.J. Harvey – "C'mon Billy"
 Weezer – "Undone – The Sweater Song"
 Violent Femmes – "Kiss Off"
 They Might Be Giants – "Particle Man"
 Sex Pistols – "Pretty Vacant"
 Bad Religion – "American Jesus"
 Victoria Williams with Lou Reed – "Crazy Mary"
 Björk – "Aeroplane"
 The Verve Pipe – "Villains"
 Radiohead – "Fake Plastic Trees"

References

External links
 MTV Hive's 120 Minutes site  – MTV's official destination for new episodes of 120 Minutes with Matt Pinfield, 120 Seconds and vintage 120 Minutes videos and performances.
 altmusictv: 120 Minutes archive – Contains playlists and a full transcript of the final interview.
 MTV2's official Subterranean site – The successor to 120 Minutes on MTV2.
 VH1 Classic – Official website of the cable network that airs VH1 Classic 120 Minutes.
 
 USA Today's Pop Candy article on 120 Minutes

1986 American television series debuts
1980s American music television series
1990s American music television series
2000s American music television series
2003 American television series endings
2011 American television series debuts
2010s American music television series
2013 American television series endings
English-language television shows
MTV original programming
MTV2 original programming
American television series revived after cancellation
Alternative rock